The voiceless retroflex nasal is an extremely rare type of consonantal sound, used in very few spoken languages.

Features 

Features of the voiceless retroflex nasal:

Occurrence 
It is found in Iaai.

See also 
 Index of phonetics articles

References

External links
 

Retroflex consonants
Nasal consonants
Pulmonic consonants
Voiceless consonants